This article attempts to list some of the oldest extant buildings surviving in the state of Maryland in the United States of America. Some dates are approximate and based upon dendrochronology, architectural studies, and historical records. Sites on the list are generally from the First Period of American architecture or earlier.
To be listed here a site must:
date from prior to 1776; or 
be the oldest building in a county, large city, or oldest of its type (church, government building, etc.).

Oldest overall

Oldest by county

Oldest by type

See also
List of the oldest buildings in the United States
National Register of Historic Places listings in Maryland

References 

Maryland
Architecture in Maryland
Oldest